The Yu Aw Synagogue is located in the Momanda neighbourhood of the old city of Herat, in western Afghanistan. The area was once known as Mahalla-yi Musahiya, or the "Neighbourhood of the Jews". It is the only synagogue in Herat that has been preserved with most of its original characteristics, although it is currently in a state of disrepair. There is no definitive date of construction of the synagogue. When Israel was founded in 1948, the estimated 280 Jewish families that lived in Herat began leaving. Today, there are no Jews left in the city.

In 2020, Al Jazeera reported that part of the complex was restored by the local government in 2009. It is the only synagogue in Herat that has been preserved with most of its original features. Although badly damaged, it was recently converted into an infant school. There are 3 other synagogues in Herat, in a more advanced state of disrepair, two had been converted to schools and one to a mosque. Not far from the synagogue there is still a mikvah (ritual bath) formerly called Hamman-e Yahudiha, which has been converted into a hamman for Muslim men. There is also a Jewish cemetery that contains around 1,000 graves.

Description
The remains of the building on the east, north and south sides of the courtyard are now used as family housing. A room in the basement of the structure on the west side of the courtyard is used for housing by one of the employees of the Herat Department of Historic Monuments Preservation. The remainder of the building is in a precarious condition. Annette Ittig's report does not date the synagogue.

A preliminary survey carried out by Annette Ittig in 1998 notes that:

See also
History of the Jews in Afghanistan
Oldest synagogues in the world

References

External links

Photographs
International Survey of Jewish Monuments: The Yu Aw synagogue in Herat, Afghanistan
The Struggle To Preserve Afghanistan’s Jewish Heritage

Former synagogues
Synagogues in Afghanistan
Buildings and structures in Herat Province